Elephant is a science book by L. Sprague de Camp, published by Pyramid Books in July 1964 as part of The Worlds of Science series. The cover title is Elephant: The Fascinating Life Cycle of the World's Largest Land Animal.

Summary
The book treats its subject comprehensively, covering elephants in captivity and the wild, their use in ancient warfare, modern conflicts between elephants and farmers, and preservation efforts, among other topics. A "generalized account of the life history of elephants, living and fossil, their relatives, and their use throughout history," it deals with "the various aspects of the world's largest land animal, from fossils to captive elephants." It is illustrated with pen-and-ink sketches, maps and charts, and includes eight pages of unnumbered black-and-white photographs, a bibliography and index.

Reception
The Science News-Letter notes that the book is "[d]esigned for the general reader and student."

The Science Teacher praises the book's "academic and sometimes lighthearted text," noting "[t]he author has a knack for interjecting subtleties such as 'nobody has yet fitted an elephant with false teeth.'" It rates the book "an excellent junior high school library reference, especially for students who need a readable source for a class report."

Relation to other works
While a decent study, the book is important more for its insight into the mind of the author than in its own right, elephants being a lifelong interest of de Camp's that figures in many of his other literary works. In his early time travel novel Lest Darkness Fall his protagonist Martin Padway pens a similar monograph, while in his historical novel An Elephant for Aristotle details the difficulties in transporting an elephant from India to Greece during ancient times. De Camp also wrote a number of articles about elephants, a few of which appeared, together with a chapter selected from the present work, in his later collection The Fringe of the Unknown (1983).

References

1964 non-fiction books
Natural history books
Books by L. Sprague de Camp
Pyramid Books books